Eurydactylodes vieillardi, sometimes known commonly as Bavay's gecko or Vieillard's chameleon gecko, is a species of lizard in the family Diplodactylidae. The species is endemic to Grande Terre in New Caledonia.

Etymology
The specific name, vieillardi, is in honor of French botanist Eugène Vieillard.

Habitat

Description

Reproduction
E. vieillardi is oviparous.

References

Further reading
Bavay A (1869). "Catalogue des Reptiles de la Nouvelle-Calédonie et description d'espèces nouvelles ". Mémoires de la Société Linnéenne de Normandie 15: 1–37. (Platydactylus vieillardi, new species, p. 10). (in French).
Boulenger GA (1885). Catalogue of the Lizards in the British Museum (Natural History). Second Edition. Volume I. Geckonidæ ... London: Trustees of the British Museum (Natural History). (Taylor and Francis, printers). xii + 436 pp. + Plates I–XXXII. (Eurydactylus vieillardi, pp. 192–193).
Sauvage HE (1879). "Note sur les Geckotiens de la Nouvelle-Calédonie". Bulletin de la Société Philomathique de Paris, Septième Série [Seventh Series] 3: 63–73. (Eurydactylus vieillardi, new combination, pp. 70–71). (in French).
Wermuth H (1965). "Liste der rezenten Amphibien und Reptilien, Gekkonidae, Pygopodidae, Xantusiidae". Das Tierreich 80: 1–246. (Eurydactylodes vieillardi, new combination, p. 30). (in German).

Eurydactylodes
Reptiles described in 1869
Taxa named by Arthur René Jean Baptiste Bavay
Geckos of New Caledonia